Vanangamudi is an upcoming Indian Tamil action thriller film written and directed by Selva. The film features Arvind Swamy and Ritika Singh in the lead roles with  Chandini Tamilarasan, Nandita Swetha, Ganesh Venkatraman, and Simran playing supporting roles. Featuring music composed by D. Imman, the venture began production in February 2017.

Cast

 Arvind Swamy as Anbazhagan IPS
 Ritika Singh as Anbazhagan's Wife
 Nandita Swetha as Inspector
 Chandini Tamilarasan
 Simran
 Ganesh Venkatraman
Kurinji Nathan  
 Thambi Ramaiah
 Harish Uthaman
 Sathyapriya
 Raj Kapoor
 Udhayabhanu Mageshwaran
 OAK Sundar
 Hasini
 Sri Ganesh

Production
Arvind Swamy and director Selva discussed collaborations in early 2014 and during May 2014, Selva announced that the pair would work on a film titled Vanangamudi, where Arvind Swamy would portray a police officer. Despite planning an initial start date of July 2014, the film was delayed as Arvind Swamy prioritised other commitments. In early 2017, Arvind Swamy confirmed that the pair would begin work on the film soon, with Ritika Singh selected to play the lead actress. She says that, she is playing a lively and independent role in this movie. Magicbox Films agreed to produce the film, while D. Imman was signed as the film's music composer. For two further female lead roles of a journalist and a police officer, the team signed Chandini Tamilarasan and Nandita Swetha. Daniel Balaji was also briefly attached to the project but opted out citing date issues with his work for Ippadai Vellum (2017). Balaji was subsequently replaced by Harish Uthaman. 

The film began production on 15 January 2017 following a launch event. The first schedule began in Nungambakkam, with further schedules planned in Kodaikanal and Tuticorin.

References

External links 

Unreleased Tamil-language films
Films shot in Chennai
Indian action drama films
Films scored by D. Imman
Films directed by Selva (director)